The Lithuania men's national under-16 and under-17 basketball team (Lithuanian: Lietuvos nacionalinė vaikinų jaunučių iki 16 ir jaunių iki 17 krepšinio rinktinė), is the representative for Lithuania in international basketball competitions, and it is organized and run by the Lithuanian Basketball Federation. The team represents Lithuania at the FIBA Europe Under-16 Championship, where they have a chance to qualify into the FIBA Under-17 World Championship.

Competitive record

World Cup

Europe Championship

References

External links

M U16 and U17
Men's national under-16 basketball teams
Men's national under-17 basketball teams